In Brazil, the Civilian Police is the name of the investigative state police forces.

The Civilian Police are agencies of the public administration of the states and of the Federal District of Brazil, whose function is, in accordance with article 144 of the Federal Constitution of 1988, the exercise of the public security for the preservation of the public order, of the safety of the people and the patrimony.

Each of the states and the Federal District has its own "Civilian Police Department", which carries out detective work, forensics and criminal investigation, acting as a state bureau of investigation, while the "Military Police" carries out preventive police duties.

It aims at the exercise of functions of judiciary police and the exercise of activities of administrative and security police, which are indispensable to the preservation of the juridical order, to the (promotion of the) harmonic life of the community, and to guarantee citizens' rights and liberty.

Description

The Civilian Police of Brazil had origin in the General Intendancy of Police, created in Rio de Janeiro in 1808. 

With the transference of the Portuguese Royal Family to Brazil in 1808, the police started to be regulated, have structure and important social role.
 
The Police General Intendancy of the Court and the State of Brazil (Intendência Geral de Polícia da Corte e do Estado do Brasil, in Portuguese) was created by charter of D. João VI on May 10 of that year, centralizing the police attributes of competence belonging to several authorities  such as Ouvidor Geral, the alcaydes, the quadrilheiros and the road and assaults captains.

The first Police General Superintendent was Councilor Paulo Fernandes Viana who organized the police administration in Rio de Janeiro city as it used to be in Lisbon.

The Police General Intendancy went through the phase of the Brazilian politic emancipation movement which finally culminated on September 7, 1822.

Civilian Police had been gradually developing for all country during the governments Imperial and Republican. Today, the constitutional existence of the Civilian Police and its attributions elapse of article 144, IV and 144 § 4°, of the Federal Constitution.

Organization
27 Civil Police Forces in Brazil, one for each State of the federacy exist. They are directed by a Head of Police, chosen amongst the Commission agents of Police of career. 

The services of judiciary police are given through the Police stations of Police, agencies that have jurisdiction on small cities or quarters of the great cities.

Basic organic structure

Police Superior Council
A collegiate organ
Cabinet
Direct assistance of the Police Chief
Planning and Police Operations Department
Operational planning
General Office of Police
Fiscalization
Police State Academy
Professional formation
Police Departments
Operational organs
Administration Department
Administrative support
Technical-Scientific Department 
Technical-scientific support (in some states, this is a separated organization)

Special investigations
Special Investigations Department, which is the information organ of the states police, is responsible for the highly complex police investigations; yet as its duty it has the dignitaries safety and the maintenance of the Special Operations Services (CORE, GOE and others) which uses highly trained policemen in dangerous tasks that the police have to face daily.

Police inquiry

The function of Judiciary Police is exercised through the police inquiry, included in the Brazilian prosecution law in order to investigate the penal infractions and their responsibility. When concluded the inquiry is sent to the criminal judge.

Hierarchic degrees

Police Authority
Commissioner of Police (Delegado/Comissário) = A (Deputy Sheriff) and a Magistrate. It is demanded to a Commissioner of Police be: A Bachelor of Laws & have a minimum of three years of legal or police experience.
Agents of the Authority
Notary of Police (Escrivão) 
Agent, Investigator or Inspector (Agente, Investigador ou Inspetor)
Police Specialists
CSI - Crime Scene Investigator (Perito Criminal)

Note: In several Brazilian states, Police Specialists (Expert Criminal) direct an unattended Police Department, generally called "Scientific Police" or "Technical Police", responsible for criminal expertise at the respective state.

Civil police of Brazil

Polícia Civil do Distrito Federal - Brasilia
Polícia Civil do Estado do Acre
Polícia Civil do Estado de Alagoas
Polícia Civil do Estado do Amapá
Polícia Civil do Estado do Amazonas
Polícia Civil do Estado da Bahia
Polícia Civil do Estado do Ceará
Polícia Civil do Estado do Espírito Santo
Polícia Civil do Estado de Goiás
Polícia Civil do Estado do Maranhão
Polícia Civil do Estado do Mato Grosso
Polícia Civil do Estado do Mato Grosso do Sul
Polícia Civil do Estado de Minas Gerais
Polícia Civil do Estado do Pará
Polícia Civil do Estado da Paraíba
Polícia Civil do Estado do Paraná
Polícia Civil do Estado de Pernambuco
Polícia Civil do Estado do Piauí
Polícia Civil do Estado do Rio Grande do Norte
Polícia Civil do Estado do Rio Grande do Sul
Polícia Civil do Estado do Rio de Janeiro
Polícia Civil do Estado de Rondônia
Polícia Civil do Estado de Roraima
Polícia Civil do Estado de Santa Catarina
Polícia Civil do Estado de São Paulo
Polícia Civil do Estado de Sergipe
Polícia Civil do Estado de Tocantins

Weaponry

 Taurus pistols
 Glock pistols
 Colt pistols
 Smith & Wesson pistols
 Heckler & Koch MP5
 Colt M16A2
 Heckler & Koch G3

See also
 Grupo de Operações Especiais (GOE)
 CORE (Brazil)

External links
Civil Police of Rio de Janeiro State, Brazil Official web site, in Portuguese
Civil Police of the Minas Gerais State 
Brazilian Federal Police Official web site, in Portuguese

 
State law enforcement agencies of Brazil